The 2013–14 season is Zamalek Sporting Club's 103rd season of football, 58th consecutive season in the Egyptian Premier League. The club also plays in the CAF Champions League.

Team kit
The team kits for this season are manufactured by Adidas.

Squad

Egyptian Football Association (EFA) rules are that a team may only have 3 foreign born players in the squad. 
The Squad Has 25 Players Registered as Professionals and 5 Players Registered (-U23) and 2 Players of the Youth academy

Out on loan

Transfers

In

Friendlies

Pre-season friendlies

Mid-season friendlies

2013 CAF Champions League

Group stage

Matches

2013 Egypt Cup

Egyptian Premier League

Group 2

Results by matchday

Results summary

Matches

Championship play-off

Matches

2014 CAF Champions League

Preliminary round

First round

Second round

Group stage

Matches

2014 Egypt Cup

References

 http://www.angelfire.com/ak/EgyptianSports/zamalek201314det.html

Zamalek SC seasons
Zamalek